Mr. Wilkinson's Widows is a farce-comedy in Three Acts by William Gillette from the Alexandre Bisson play Feu Toupinel. The play opened under the management of Charles Frohman on Monday, March 30, 1891 at Proctor's Theatre and continued until the end of the season with the final curtain falling on June 13. Mr. Wilkinson's Widows returned some ten weeks later with the coming of the new season and remained open until October 3, 1891.

Synopsis
The plot of Mr. Wilkinson's Widows, revolves around Mrs. Percival Perrin and Mrs. Henry F. Dickerson, both widowed seven years earlier, now remarried and living under the same roof. Each is unaware that their late husbands were in fact the same man, Mr. Wilkinson. The introduction into the story of a former admirer of Mrs. Dickerson, Major Mallory, sets off a chain of events that disrupts the domestic bliss of both women and eventually unravels the late Mr. Wilkinson’s secret.

Revue
Los Angeles Herald, February 5, 1892

"Why is it that American play-writers still have to go to Germany or France for themes of their work? Mr. Gillette has made a delightful comedy out of Mr. Wilkinson's Widows, but all he did to the original play was to cut out the risqué lines. There was an entire absence of any American tone or color, or of originality about the comedy, delightful as it was. It is to be hoped that Mr. Gillette will not become a mere adapter."

New York Cast
Benjamin Duckworth: J. W. Thompson
Susanna McAuliff: Maud White
Henry F. Dickerson: Fred Bond
Mrs. Henry F. Dickerson: Henrietta Crosman/ Esther Lyons (June 1–13)
Percival Perrin: Joseph Holland
Mrs. Percival Perrin: Louise Thorndyke Bouciacault
E. E. Pembroke: Thomas Wise
Maj. P. Ferguson Mallory: Thomas Burns
Mary: Annie Wood
Julia: Lillian Leach
August Replacements
Mrs. Percival Perrin: Georgiana Drew
Mrs. Henry F. Dickerson: Emily Bancker
E. E. Pembroke: Harry Allen
Susanna McAulff: Mattie Ferguson

Sources

1891 plays
American plays